The Real Housewives of Potomac is an American reality television series that premiered January 17, 2016, on Bravo.  The series seventh season chronicles the lives of seven women (all since season six) in and around Potomac— Gizelle Bryant, Ashley Darby, Robyn Dixon, Karen Huger, Candiace Dillard Bassett, Dr. Wendy Osefo, and Mia Thornton —as they balance their personal and business lives, along with their social circle.

Former cast members over the previous five seasons are: Charrisse Jackson-Jordan (1-2), Katie Rost (1), and Monique Samuels (2-5).

As of March 5, 2023, 131 original episodes of The Real Housewives of Potomac have aired over seven seasons.

Series overview

Episodes

Season 1 (2016)

Gizelle Bryant, Ashley Darby, Robyn Dixon, Karen Huger, Charrisse Jackson-Jordan and Katie Rost are introduced as series regulars.

Season 2 (2017)

Rost departed as a series regular. Monique Samuels joined the cast.

Season 3 (2018)

Jackson-Jordan departed as a series regular, whilst serving in a recurring capacity. Candiace Dillard Bassett joined the cast.

Season 4 (2019)

Rost served in a recurring capacity.

Season 5 (2020)

Wendy Osefo joined the cast.

Season 6 (2021)

Samuels departed as a series regular. Mia Thornton joined the cast. Askale Davis served in a recurring capacity.

Season 7 (2022–23)

Jackson-Jordan and Jacqueline Blake served in recurring capacities.

References

External links

 
 
 

The Real Housewives of Potomac
Real Housewives of Potomac
Lists of American reality television series episodes